Cardus is a Canadian conservative think tank based in Hamilton, Ontario, which has described its mission as "the renewal of North American social architecture.", and bases its work upon a "Judeo-Christian social thought". It formally describes itself as non-partisan, stating that it does not endorse any political party or candidate.

Etymology 
Cardus comes from the root cardo, which was a north-south oriented street in Roman cities considered an integral element of city planning and city life

History 

Cardus has its roots in a charity established in 1974 under the name Foundation for Research and Economics in Developing a Christian Approach to Industrial Relations and Economics, also known as the Work Research Foundation (WRF). Spearheaded by Harry Antonides and Bernard Zylstra, the work of the Work Research Foundation consisted primarily in the publication of a quarterly newsletter, Comment, and occasional conferences.

In 1996, WRF received a project grant from the Donner Canadian Foundation to deal with freedom of association in Canadian labour relations.  This project included a survey of Canadian attitudes towards unions done in cooperation with Gallup; the publication of Buying a Labour Monopoly, and numerous smaller publications and presentations.  Ray Pennings directed this project and, together with Gideon Strauss, developed a proposal to develop the Work Research Foundation into a full-fledged think tank that would be "public, credible and Christian."
Michael Van Pelt, at that time the President of the Sarnia Chamber of commerce, was hired as the first full-time employee and began work in September 2000.   Ray Pennings joined the full-time staff in 2002, having previously served as the Public Affairs Director for the Christian Labour Association of Canada.   They developed a threefold strategy of utilizing publications, research, and networking events in order to map the institutional space that exists between government and the markets.

Early research projects looked at leadership in the business sector, patterns of trade between Canada and the United States, and labour mobility in Canada's construction sector.  The publication of Comment magazine as an anchor magazine commenced in 2002 and regular events, many of which involved Senior Fellows recruited to the organization, were held across the country.

Research 

From its guiding principles, Cardus currently works on three fronts. First, partnering with Notre Dame University, Cardus launched the Cardus Education Survey, an ongoing study of the outcomes of education in both the public and private sectors in North American secondary schools.  Second, Cardus is also involved in Social Cities, a project which helps promote the complex relationships of people, culture, and institutions that make up North American urban spaces. Third, Cardus is engaged with Work and Economics, constructing arguments and policy related to issues of work dignity and labour relations. In 2014, Cardus's research was used by Member of Parliament, Jason Kenney, in his remarks for a conference of Canada's New Industrial Revolution.
 Education and Culture exists to provide reliable, credible data for non-government types of education.
 Work and Economics connects belief and behavior as way to understand work and economics in North America that can contribute to the common good.
 Social Cities explores complex issues around making good cities through integrating work in a variety of social infrastructure project areas.

Publications 

Cardus produces two periodicals: Comment, a "journal of public theology for the common good"; and Convivium,<ref>'Convivium]</ref> a "journal of faith in our common life". Two occasional products round out Cardus's publications: Cardus Policy in Public and Lexview Cardus Policy in Public
Cardus's research in public policy covers the fields of urban planning, work and labour, and education.  This research is released regularly throughout the calendar year.  In addition to its regularly issued periodicals, Cardus also produces more in-depth reports.

 CommentEdited by Anne Snyder, [https://comment.org/ Comment magazine aims to be a journal of "public theology for the common good."

 ConviviumPublished by Peter Stockland and Edited by Fr. Raymond J. de Souza, Convivium is a periodical concerned with "faith in our common life" and publishes a range of writers of all faith traditions.

 Lexview''
Started in 1998, Lexview attempts to provide timely analysis to the court cases shaping Canadian Law.

 Cardus Audio (podcast)
A podcast and CD series of lectures and interviews conducted by Cardus on a range of topics.

Conferences and Events 

Cardus hosts a variety of private and public events across North America for business, educational and political leaders.

 The Hill Family Lecture series
An ongoing annual lecture series hosted by Cardus and funded by the HIll Companies. 2014 lecturers include Ross Douthat and Rex Murphy. Past speakers include Barbara Kay, Mark Carney, Conrad Black, and Rex Murphy.

Funding 

Cardus is supported through its publications and from private donors.  It is a registered charity in Canada and in the United States.

Individuals associated with Cardus 

Notable scholars associated with Cardus include James K.A. Smith, Stanley Carlson-Thies, Jonathan Chaplin, Eleanor Clitheroe, Janet Epp Buckingham, Raymond de Souza, Peter Stockland, Gideon Strauss, Paul Williams, Jonathan Wellum.

See also 
 Center for Public Justice
 Centre for Cultural Renewal which was incorporated into Cardus in 2010

References

External links 
 Cardus Home Page
 Cardus Religious Schools Initiative
 Comment Magazine
 Convivium Magazine
 The Cardus Daily Blog

Political and economic think tanks based in Canada
Think tanks established in 1990